Nawaf Al-Ahmad Al-Jaber Al-Sabah (born 25 June 1937) is the emir of Kuwait. On 29 September 2020, he succeeded to the throne following the death of his half-brother Sabah Al-Ahmad Al-Jaber Al-Sabah.

Nawaf had been nominated as crown prince on 7 February 2006.

Early life and education
Nawaf Al-Ahmed Al-Jaber Al-Sabah was born on 25 June 1937. He is a son of the 10th ruler of Kuwait, Ahmad Al-Jaber Al-Sabah. He studied at various schools in Kuwait.

Career

Nawaf is one of the most senior members of the House of Sabah. At 25, he was appointed governor of Hawalli on 21 February 1962 and held the post until 19 March 1978. He was Minister of Interior from 1978 to 26 January 1988, when he was appointed Minister of Defense. Following the liberation of Kuwait in the Gulf War, Nawaf was appointed the acting minister of labor and social affairs on 20 April 1991 and held the post until 17 October 1992. Following his appointment to the cabinet in 1991, a group of senior military officers sent a letter to Jaber al-Ahmad, the Emir at the time, demanding that Nawaf, the minister of defense during the Iraqi invasion of Kuwait, and Salem al-Sabah, the minister of interior during the invasion, be dismissed from the government and investigated for Kuwait's lack of military preparedness on the day of the invasion. As a result, Nawaf was not appointed to a cabinet-level position until 2003.

On 16 October 1994, Nawaf was appointed deputy chief of the Kuwait National Guard and held that post until 2003. The same year, he reassumed the post of minister of the interior until an Amiri Decree was issued on 16 October 2003 making him first Deputy Prime Minister of Kuwait and Minister of Interior. Nawaf played a role in supporting programs that support national unity among the Cooperation Council for the Arab States of the Gulf and Arab countries.

With the ascendance of Sabah Al-Ahmad Al-Jaber Al-Sabah to the leadership of Kuwait on 29 January 2006, an Amiri Decree was issued on 7 February 2006 officially designating Nawaf the Crown Prince. This was contrary to the tradition of the Al-Sabah family, according to which the offices of Emir and Crown Prince are supposed to alternate between the Al-Jaber and Al-Salem branches.

Sabah died on 29 September 2020 and Nawaf was announced as the Emir of Kuwait during a meeting of the National Assembly.

Personal life
Nawaf married Sharifa Sulaiman Al-Jasem Al-Ghanim, daughter of Sulaiman Al-Jasem Al-Ghanim by his wife, Ruqayyah bint Abdullah Al-Abd Al-Razzaq. They have four sons and a daughter.

Honors and awards 
: Knight Grand Cross of the Order of Civil Merit (23 May 2008)
: Knight Grand Cross of the Order of the Liberator General San Martín (1 August 2011)
: (29 January 2007)
: Grand Collar of the State of Palestine (13 November 2018)

See also
House of Al-Sabah
Salem Al-Ali Al-Sabah
Fahad Al-Ahmed Al-Jaber Al-Sabah
Mubarak Abdullah Al-Jaber Al-Sabah

References

External Links 

1937 births
Living people
House of Al-Sabah
Grand Cross of the Order of Civil Merit
Grand Crosses of the Order of the Liberator General San Martin
Defence ministers of Kuwait
Labour ministers of Kuwait
Interior ministers of Kuwait 
Social affairs ministers of Kuwait 
Rulers of Kuwait
Muslim monarchs
Kuwaiti Muslims